The Arch and Ridge Streets Historic District is a historic district located in Marquette, Michigan, running along Arch and Ridge Streets from Front Street to Lake Superior. It was listed on the National Register of Historic Places in 1980. The district includes the Call House.

Description 
The residential core of the district is defined by ridge running east-and-west (known locally as simply "the Ridge"), which gives Ridge Street its name. The district includes spectacular residences built for some of the leading citizens of Marquette, as well as more modest houses for white- and blue-collar workers. Two public structures, the Peter White Library and First United Methodist Church, are also located within the district.

Seven of these structures are built from local sandstone. These include the Daniel Merritt House and St. Paul's Episcopal Cathedral. A small cottage in the neighborhood was the inspiration for Carroll Watson Rankin's 1904 novel, The Dandelion Cottage.

History 
The first construction in the Arch and Ridge Streets Historic District was in 1867, when Peter White built the first house on the Ridge. Most of the construction in the district took place over the next 35 years as other leading citizens of Marquette followed White's lead, including pioneer businessman and industrialist Hiram A. Burt, Charles H. Call, Daniel Merritt, Andrew Ripka, David Murray, Josiah Reynolds, Frank Bennett Spear, and James Jopling.

Gallery

See also

References

Marquette, Michigan
Geography of Marquette County, Michigan
Gothic Revival architecture in Michigan
Italianate architecture in Michigan
Historic districts on the National Register of Historic Places in Michigan
National Register of Historic Places in Marquette County, Michigan